Malyan (also Romanized as Malyān and Maliān) is a village in Beyza Rural District, Beyza District, Sepidan County, Fars Province, Iran. At the 2006 census, its population was 681, in 159 families.

References 

Populated places in Beyza County